CLY or cly may refer to:

 CLY, the IATA code for Calvi – Sainte-Catherine Airport, Corsica, France
 CLY, the National Rail station code for Chinley railway station, Derbyshire, England
 cly, the ISO 639-3 code for Eastern Highland Chatino language, Oaxaca, Mexico